Prem Pujari is a 1970 Indian Hindi-language romantic drama film produced, directed and written by Dev Anand for Navketan Films, his directorial debut. The movie stars Dev Anand, Waheeda Rehman, Shatrughan Sinha, Prem Chopra, Madan Puri and a then-unknown Amrish Puri. It has several popular songs composed and directed by S. D. Burman. The songs were written by Gopaldas Neeraj. The film was a commercial failure. However, the music album is regarded as a masterpiece among classical Hindi film music aficionados, particularly the songs "Shokhiyon Mein Ghola Jaye" sung by Kishore Kumar and Lata Mangeshkar, "Phoolon Ke Rang Se" sung by Kishore Kumar and "Rangeela Re Tere Rang Mein" sung by Lata Mangeshkar.

Plot
Lieutenant Ramdev Bakshi (Dev Anand) is the son of widowed army officer Durgadas Bakshi. Ram is an innocent man who has a deep interest in wildlife. Ram is in the army as per his father's choice. He loves Suman (Waheeda Rahman), a beautiful, cheerful lady living in Ram's village in Khemkaran. Ram and Suman spend their time together romancing.

One day, a letter comes from the Indian army stating that Ram should return back to the Indo-Chinese border since his holidays are over. Ram engages in a debate with his father where he wishes to leave the army. But however, he ultimately bids farewell to his village and Suman. On reaching the border, he refuses to take part in the war since he believes in non-violence or ahimsa. Frustrated, the army sentences him to 2 years in cellular jail for not abiding to the orders of his seniors. Fortunately, Ram runs away from the police and is roaming in the mountains of north-east.

Later, he turns himself in and seeks forgiveness for his refusal to listen to orders by spying for India. He is sent to Beijing from where he passes on many important Chinese secrets to India, helping them win the war. Later, Pandit Nehru awards him with the country's highest military honor. After the war, he marries Suman and the two live happily together.

Cast

 Dev Anand as Lt. Ramdev Bakshi / Peter Andrews / Yoo Thok
 Waheeda Rehman as Suman Mehra
 Shatrughan Sinha as Pakistani Army Officer
 Zaheeda as Rani Chang / Mrs. Andrews / Mrs. Seema Yoo Thok
 Prem Chopra as Bilkis Mohammed (Billy)
 Anup Kumar (actor) as Kulbhushan
 Nasir Hussain as Retd. Subedar Major Durgaprasad Bakshi
 Madan Puri as Chang
 Manmohan as Chinese Army Officer
 Sajjan as Suman's maternal uncle
 Amrish Puri as Henchman in church of Spain.
 Sachin as Sunder
 Siddhu as Chamanlal

Location
The film was shot in Switzerland and has Grimsel Hotel in one of the song sequences. Here, Shatrughan Sinha was picked to play his part from the gathered public. Part of Prem Pujari was also shot at Astagaon near Shirdi in Ahmednagar district of Maharashtra.

Music
The music was composed by S. D. Burman, with lyrics by Neeraj. Several of the songs from the film became popular, "Phoolon Ke Rang Se" sung by Kishore Kumar (music of which was reused by Burman from his earlier Bengali song Borne Gondhe Chonde Geetitey), "Rangila Re Tere Rang Mein" which was a blend of folk and modern and sung by Lata Mangeshkar, "Shokhiyon Mein Ghola Jaaye" by Mangeshkar and Kishore Kumar, "Taaqat Watan Ki Hum Se Hai" (patriotic song), and the number in Burman's voice "Prem Ke Pujari Hum Hain". According to Anantharaman, Dev Anand stated that "Rangila Re" remained his all-time Navketan favourite song.

Reception
While Prem Pujari did not do well at the box office, Sachin dev Burman's soundtrack became a success and was termed as "superlative" and as a "brilliant score". The songs are known for the purity of their Urdu and Hindi languages and are regarded as evergreen classics.

References

External links
 

1970 films
Indian spy films
1970s Hindi-language films
Films scored by S. D. Burman
Films directed by Dev Anand
Films shot in Bihar
India–Pakistan relations in popular culture
Films shot in Switzerland
Military of Pakistan in films
1970 directorial debut films